Sacred Heart College is a secondary school in Auckland, New Zealand.

History 
The college was opened in 1903 in Ponsonby, by the Marist Brothers. It is the oldest continuously existing Catholic boys' secondary school in Auckland although it has changed its location, moving to its current Glen Innes site in 1955. St Paul's College was founded on the old Sacred Heart College site in that year. The Marist Brothers continue to be a presence in the school community, with both teaching and maintenance of school grounds undertaken in part by the Brothers. The headmaster role at the college was served solely by Marist Brothers up until 1993, when Brendan Schollum took the role; the college's first lay principal. In 2003, the college held its centennial celebrations, which included the opening of a new administration building, technology block and Year 7 and 8 Department, and in 2005 it celebrated 50 years of being at the Glen Innes site.

Headmasters 
 Brother Kenneth ‘Bosco’ Camden (1974 - 1981)
 Brendan Schollum (1993 - ) (first non-Marist brother headmaster)
 Phillip Mahoney (- 2006)
 Jim Dale (2007 - 2018)
 Stephen Dooley (2019 - 2021)
 Kieran Fouhy (2021 - 2022)
 Patrick Walsh (2022–present)

Academics 
As a state-integrated school, Sacred Heart College follows the New Zealand Curriculum (NZC). In Years 11 to 13, students complete the National Certificate of Educational Achievement (NCEA), the main secondary school qualification in New Zealand.

Sport 

Sacred Heart offers a wide range of sporting options to its pupils, many competing at a national level. The Sacred Heart 1st XV remains the only team never to have been relegated from the 1A grade. In football the 1st XI team has gained the national title in 2018 and 2019. In Water Polo, 2020 saw the college claim the North Island Championship title at all three levels; senior, junior and intermediate.

Sacred Heart College offer a Sports Institute programme for boys in Years 7–10. This development programme is offered in basketball, cricket, football, rugby union, rowing, and water polo.

Houses 

The houses of Sacred Heart College are named after either famous people in the Catholic and Marist community in New Zealand, or important figures in the school's history.
The six houses are:
 Basil
Basil House is named after Brother Basil, who taught at the college for over 50 years, and was also the college's first principal.
 Coolahan
Coolahan House is named after the landowner who donated the land for the original site of the college in Ponsonby, now the site of St. Paul's College.
 Lenihan
Lenihan House is named after the Bishop of Auckland in 1903, who saw the need for a Catholic boys' school in the area and was a driving force in Sacred Heart's foundation.
 Marcellin
Marcellin house is named after Marcellin Champagnat, founder of the Marist order.
 Pompallier
Pompallier house is named after Jean Baptiste Pompallier (1802–1871), the first Catholic vicar apostolic and bishop to visit and be located in New Zealand (arrived 1838); first Catholic Bishop of Auckland (1848–1868).
 Stephen
Stephen House is named after Brother Stephen Coll FMS, a well known former teacher and Marist Brother at the college.

Boarding hostel 
The boarding hostel is home to roughly 160–170 boarders from all over New Zealand and from overseas.

Controversies

Bullying 
In 2019, New Zealand's Chief Ombudsman reported on cases of bullying complaints made in 2016. At the time, a recommendation was made to the board of trustees at the school to formally apologise for the way the complaints were handled and to review the school's harassment and bullying policies. These policies have been updated and are published on the college website.

Sacred Heart College's response to the bullying complaints was slammed by the Chief Ombudsman. Two students anonymously approached TVNZ 1 News claiming they had been bullied. One mother recalled a story when one child came up to her son, and said "go and commit suicide so I can piss on your grave." When asked if it had a "bullying problem," Sacred Heart College responded that the board of trustees accepted that the 2016 matter had not been well handled at the time. However changes had been made, along with the introduction of focused initiatives for a stronger, more caring college.

Discrimination 
Sacred Heart College has been criticised by New Zealand's Chief Ombudsman for declining in 2018 to offer an enrolment place to an autistic boy, using the excuse that he was "not Catholic enough." After an investigation, it was found that Sacred Heart College had ranked other non-Catholic prospective students higher than the autistic boy, raising questions around whether the school was actively discriminating against disabled persons. The Board of Trustees offered a statement of regret that anguish may have been caused, and accepted the need for compassion.

Drugs 
In 2003, seven students were expelled for possessing and using marijuana on school grounds.

Concerns for student safety 
In 2020, a report of an unidentified source of threat was made to the college, however after Police investigation, there was no evidence to suggest there was any validity.

In July 2022, Sacred Heart College was forced to close for a day after threats were made against pupils on social media.

Marist Brothers allegations 

As an organisation, the Marist Brothers has a long history of covering up sexual abuse allegations to protect its members.

Brother Giles Waters taught at Sacred Heart College in the 1980s. He has been subject to numerous sexual abuse allegations. While no evidence has yet emerged of abuse occurring at Sacred Heart College, it has been established that the Marist Brothers would have known of Brother Giles Walters’ history at the time of his employment.

Brother Kenneth ‘Bosco’ Camden was Headmaster of Sacred Heart College from 1974 - 1981. In 1990, Brother Kenneth Camden was convicted of sexual abuse crimes. Despite the conviction, Brother Kenneth Camden's death was acknowledged by the college in 2014. Brother Kenneth Camden's time at Sacred Heart College continues to be celebrated on the Marist Brothers’ website.

Notable alumni 

The official alumni group is the Sacred Heart College Old Boys Association. Some of these well-known men include:

Public service 
 John Belgrave – Chief Ombudsman
 Brian Donnelly – Member of Parliament 
 Neil Kirton – Member of Parliament; Associate Minister of Health and Minister of Customs. 
 James Henare – Maori leader 
 Ratu Sir Kamisese Mara – former Prime Minister of Fiji and President of Fiji
 Sir Anand Satyanand – Governor-General of New Zealand
Peter Fa'afiu - diplomat, global director Amnesty International (first of Pacific descent)

The Arts 
 K O Arvidson – poet and academic
 Mike Chunn – musician
 Dan Davin – author, Rhodes Scholar
 Dave Dobbyn – musician
 Tim Finn – musician
 Neil Finn – musician
 Toa Fraser – writer and film director
 Jeffrey Grice – musician
 M K Joseph – poet and novelist
 Michael King – author, historian
 Brendhan Lovegrove – comedian
 Ivan Mercep – Architect (Officer of the New Zealand Order of Merit for services to architecture; awarded the Gold Medal of the New Zealand Institute of Architects in 2008)
 Ian Morris – musician
 Milan Mrkusich - artist and designer
 Vincent O'Sullivan – writer
 Tim Radford – journalist
 John Cowie Reid – founder of the Mercury Theatre, professor of English, writer
 Paolo Rotondo – actor, screenwriter
 Peter Urlich – musician
 Joseph Fa’afiu - author, New Zealand Champion of Public Speaking 2017

Broadcasting 
 Dominic Bowden – TV presenter
 Pat Brittenden – broadcaster

Religion 
 Reginald John Delargey (1914–1979) – Auxiliary Bishop of Auckland (1957–1970); Eighth Catholic Bishop Of Auckland (1970–1974); Fifth Archbishop of Wellington (1974–1979) (Cardinal).
 Denis Devcich – director of the Mother of God Brothers
 Patrick James Dunn (b. 1950) – Eleventh Catholic Bishop of Auckland (1994–2021)
 John Patrick Kavanagh (1913–1985) – Fourth  Catholic Bishop of Dunedin (1949–1985).
 John Mackey (b. 1918) – Ninth Catholic Bishop of Auckland (1974–1983)
 Denzil Meuli (Pierre Denzil) (1926–2019) – priest of the Diocese of Auckland, writer, former editor of the Zealandia and a leading New Zealand traditionalist Catholic
 Owen Noel Snedden (1917–1981) Auxiliary Bishop of Wellington (1962–1981); first Auckland-born priest to be ordained a bishop.

Sport
 Ben Afeaki     – rugby player, All Black 
 Mark Anscombe  – rugby union coach; currently head coach of the Canadian national team
 Cyril Brownlie – rugby player, All Black
 Nathan Cleary - rugby league player, Penrith Panthers and NSW Blues
 Kieran Crowley – rugby player, All Black; former coach of the Canadian national team,former coach of Benetton, coach of the Italian national team  
 Greg Davis – Wallaby captain
 Percy Erceg – rugby player, All Black and New Zealand Maori selector
 Pelimani Fisi'iahi – rugby player, Tongan international
 Sean Fitzpatrick – rugby player, All Black captain
 Kurtis Haiu    – rugby player
 Craig Innes    – rugby player, All Black
 Wilfrid Kalaugher – teacher and athlete
 Solomone Kata  – Tongan rugby league player for the New Zealand Warriors
 Mata'afa Keenan- rugby player, Samoan international
 Niko Kirwan – professional football player
 Nili Latu      – rugby player, Tongan international
 Paul MacDonald – Olympic kayaker and surf lifesaver
 Finau Maka     – rugby player, Tongan international
 Isitolo Maka – rugby player, All Black
 Morrie McHugh – rugby player, All Black
 Kevin O'Neill – rugby player, All Black
 Sonny Parker – rugby Player, Welsh international
 Xavier Rush    – rugby Player, All Black
 Hoskins Sotutu - rugby player, All Black
 JJ Stewart   – former All Blacks coach 
 Logan Swann    – rugby league player
 Carlos Tuimavave – New Zealand Warriors
 Taniela Tupou - rugby player, Australian international 
 Loni Uhila     – rugby player
 Pat Walsh – rugby player, All Black
 Amasio Valence – rugby player, New Zealand 7's

Cricket 
Fred Klaassen, cricket player for Netherlands 
Glen Phillips - NZ Black Caps, Auckland Aces
Matthew Quinn – cricket player NZ under 19, Auckland, New Zealand A, Essex

See also 
 List of schools in New Zealand

References

Bibliography 

 A.G Butchers, Young New Zealand, Coulls Somerville Wilkie Ltd, Dunedin, 1929.
 Zealandia, 1939–1989.
 Pat Gallager, The Marist Brothers in New Zealand Fiji & Samoa 1876-1976, New Zealand Marist Brothers' Trust Board, Tuakau, 1976.
 E.R. Simmons, In Cruce Salus, A History of the Diocese of Auckland 1848 - 1980, Catholic Publication Centre, Auckland 1982.
 Thomas J. Ryder, Following all Your Ways, Lord - Recollections of Fr Thomas J. Ryder (transcribed and compiled by Margaret Paton) (Privately published, no date – perhaps early 1990s).
 Tony Waters, Confortare, A History of Sacred Heart College, Auckland 1903 - 2003: a Marist Brothers secondary school, Sacred Heart College, Auckland, 2003.
 Nicholas Reid, The Life and Work of Reginald John Delargey Cardinal, Catholic Diocese of Auckland/Pindar, Auckland, 2008.

External links 
 Sacred Heart College Website

Boarding schools in New Zealand
Boys' schools in New Zealand
Educational institutions established in 1903
Marist Brothers schools
Catholic secondary schools in Auckland
1903 establishments in New Zealand